WUSV-LD (channel 16) is a low-power television station in Fairmont, West Virginia, United States, affiliated with Antenna TV. The station is owned by TTV, LLC. WUSV-LD's transmitter is located in East View, West Virginia, on a tower shared with WVUX-LD and Cornerstone Television owned-and-operated station W24ER-D.

History
The station's construction permit was issued on September 22, 2011 under the callsign W16DH-D. The station's callsign was changed to the current WUSV-LD on December 28 of that year.

The station signed on at some time in the mid-2010s as an Antenna TV affiliate.

Subchannel

References

External links

Antenna TV affiliates
Low-power television stations in the United States
USV-LD